Tara Prakash Limbu (Nepali:तारा प्रकाश लिम्बू) is a Nepali music composer and playback singer. Born in Jhapa, he began performing in local gatherings at the age of 6 and made his first career debut with the film Papi Manchhe 2 (पापि मान्छे २). He rose to prominence after composing and recording the song entitled "Baby I Love You" for the Nepali movie Maya Ko Barima (मायाको बारीमा).

Limbu has been the music composer on the film Bir Bikram (बिर बिक्रम), produced and directed by Milan Chams, and composed the song "Sare Sare" (सारे सारे) which is the theme song of the film.

Awards and nominations

Limbu has won the NFDC Film Award 2072 for Best Musician of the year for the film November Rain.

Limbu has won the Eighth Rapati Samaj Award (Nepali: आठौं रापती समाज पुरस्कार) for the Best Musician of the year for the music of the ghazal "Pyudina bhanda bhandai pilayo sathile (पिउँदिन भन्दा भन्दै पिलायो साथिले)"

Limbu has won the Nepal Box Office Film Award: 2017 for best playback singer from movie Bir Bikram.

Discography

Philanthropy
Beside his musical career, Limbu has also contributed to various charities. He is associated with social causes like working for the underprivileged children, where he contributes to the safety of them by doing charity shows. 
In October 2015, Limbu was featured in a musical concert in Israel organised by JPLRA Tunes to raise funds for blind and orphanage children.

References

1980 births
Living people
21st-century Nepalese male singers
Music directors
Nepalese playback singers